NH3, NH-3, NH or NH 3 may refer to:

 Ammonia (chemical formula NH)
 National Highway 3 (India)
 National Highway 3 (India, old numbering)
 New Hampshire Route 3
 New Hampshire's 3rd congressional district